Jelena Pia-Comella is the Managing Coordinator for Global Action Against Mass Atrocities (GAAMAC).  She was Deputy Permanent Representative of Andorra to the United Nations in 2002 and chargé d’affaires a.i./Chief of Mission to the United States and Canada from 2001 to 2007.  She was succeeded by Carles Font-Rossell.

References

Andorran women ambassadors
Ambassadors of Andorra to the United States
Permanent Representatives of Andorra to the United Nations